Vyacheslav Yevgenyevich Zvyagin (born 19 February 1971) is a Russian football coach and a former player. He works as a goalkeepers' coach of FC Sokol Saratov.

References

1971 births
Sportspeople from Saratov
Living people
Soviet footballers
FC Sokol Saratov players
Russian footballers
Russian Premier League players
Russian football managers
Association football goalkeepers